The East Coast Integrated Depot (Chinese: 东海岸综合车厂; Malay: Depot Bersepadu East Coast), is a future integrated bus and train depot located in Changi that will serve the East West Line, Downtown Line and Thomson-East Coast Line of the Mass Rapid Transit (MRT) in Singapore.

The depot, with an expected completion date of 2025, will be located beside the current site of Changi Depot, which will be demolished. It will be the first MRT depot in Singapore to serve 3 MRT lines and also the third to be integrated with a bus depot in Singapore after the Tuas West Depot on the East West Line and Gali Batu Depot on the Downtown Line. With this design, it is estimated that there will be a saving of 44 hectares of land, equivalent to approximately 60 football fields. The depot will be able to house approximately 200 trains of varying sizes and lengths and 550 buses within the site.

History

Contract T301 for the construction of East Coast Integrated Depot, reception tunnels and its associated facilities was awarded to GS Engineering & Construction Corporation at a sum of S$1.99 billion on 21 March 2016. Construction began in 2016 and was initially planned for completion in 2024.

On 20 September 2022, the Land Transport Authority updated that structural works has reached 75% and the depot will be operational in 2025, a year later than initially planned due to delays arising from the Covid-19 pandemic.

Description
The East Coast Integrated Depot consists of a multi-level train depot and a multi-level bus depot.

Train depot
The train depot will have three levels containing three separate depots for three different MRT lines. The underground portion will house a 66-track depot for the Downtown Line, and will be brought into use following the opening of Stage 3e of the line. The at-grade portion will house a 62-track depot for the future Thomson-East Coast Line, to be used following the completion of Stage 5 of the line. Finally, the elevated portion will house a 72-track depot for the East West Line, which will replace the existing Changi Depot. All three depots will operate independently of each other, a first for Singapore, and will be designed to be able to handle trains of different lengths, of 3, 4 and 6 respectively of the lines they operate on.

The facility will be located between Expo station and Tanah Merah station on the East West Line, between Xilin station and Sungei Bedok station on the Downtown Line,  and off Sungei Bedok station on the Thomson-East Coast Line.

Bus Depot
The bus depot is a separate three-storey structure situated next to the train depot on the same site. Similar to Soon Lee Bus Park and Woodlands Bus Depot, it will contain workshops on the ground level, while the upper two levels will contain parking spaces.

References

Mass Rapid Transit (Singapore) depots
Proposed public transport in Singapore
Tampines